Wekande Walauwa (Mansion by the Lake) is a 2002 award-winning Sinhalese language drama film directed by Lester James Peries and co-produced by Asoka Perera and Chandran Rutnam. It stars Malini Fonseka, Vasanthi Chathurani and Sanath Gunathilake in lead roles along with Paboda Sandeepani and Ravindra Randeniya. Music composed by Pradeep Ratnayake. It is the 1020th Sri Lankan film in the Sinhala cinema.

Story follows the lives of wealthy people in Sri Lanka. As per the film director the story is inspired by Anton Chekhov's play The Cherry Orchard adapted to a Sri Lankan family context. It was screened out of competition at the 2003 Cannes Film Festival. The film was the country's first ever submission for the Academy Awards and received the Golden felini award from UNESCO.

The film was shot at Bandaragama, Piliyandala and Panadura areas. The release of the film delayed due to the April 2 Parliament election.

Cast 
 Malini Fonseka as Mrs.Sujata Rajasuriya
 Ravindra Randeniya as Lucas
 Vasanthi Chathurani as Sita
 Sanath Gunathilake as Gunapala
 Paboda Sandeepani as Aruni
 Iranganie Serasinghe as Aunt Catherine
 Lucky Dias as The lawyer Muthugoda
 Elson Divithurugama as Gabriel
 Senaka Wijesinghe as Student Activist
 Ranjith Rubasinghe as Student Activist
 Chitra Warakagoda

Academy Awards Submission
Wekande Walauwa was Sri Lanka's first ever submission for the Academy Awards which was held in 2003 under the category of 'Award for Best Foreign Language Film' by a Sri Lankan Director. The film was screened at the grand finale of the Asian Film Festival in Mumbai, India on August 10, 2002.

References

Notes
Film Review in Spirituality & Health by Frederic and Mary Ann Brussat
Film Review in Slant Magazine
Film de Culte
Page in Rotten Tomatoes
Asiatica Film Mediale 2003
Le Domaine
Asia-Pacific Arts

External links

National Film Corporation of Sri Lanka - Official Website
Official Website of Lester James Peries in association with Ministry of Cultural Affairs, Sri Lanka

See also
List of Academy Award winners and nominees for Best International Feature Film
Lester James Peries

2002 films
2000s Sinhala-language films
Films directed by Lester James Peries
Films set in Sri Lanka (1948–present)
2002 drama films
Sri Lankan drama films